Ikasucon was an annual three-day anime convention held during July at the Grand Wayne Convention Center in Fort Wayne, Indiana. The name of the convention has no particular meaning.

Programming
The convention typically offered anime improv, anime music video contest, chess, costume competitions, game shows, gaming tournaments, formal dance, karaoke, original animation contest, panels, rave, vendors, workshops, and video screenings.

History
Ikasucon was previously held in the Cincinnati, Ohio area until moving to Fort Wayne, Indiana in 2007 for better facilities. Ikasucon last gave an update postponing a possible 2019 Ikasucon convention after becoming inactive in 2017.

Event history

References

External links
Ikasucon on Facebook

Inactive anime conventions
Recurring events established in 2003
2003 establishments in Ohio
Annual events in Indiana
Festivals in Indiana
Culture of Fort Wayne, Indiana
Conventions in Indiana